Katcha is a village in the Bassar Prefecture in the Kara Region  of north-western Togo.

Ecology
This locale was historically a habitat for the endangered African wild dog, Lycaon pictus, although pressures of the expanding human population render the existence of this species problematic in Katcha.

References
 C. Michael Hogan. 2009. Painted Hunting Dog: Lycaon pictus, GlobalTwitcher.com, ed. N. Stromberg

Line notes

Populated places in Kara Region
Bassar Prefecture